Barnard Farm is a historic home and farm complex located near Ararat, Patrick County, Virginia. The original section of the house dates to 1829, with expansions about 1851 and in the 1930s. It is a two-story, log and frame dwelling with interior Greek Revival style decorative detailing. The front facade features a one-story American Craftsman style porch.  Also on the property are the contributing Barnard's Store (early 1950s), Kibler Post Office, garage (late 1910s), granary, spring house, cellar, chicken house, Barnard Cemetery, corn mill, barn and tobacco barn, outbuilding, pack house, and two tenant houses.

It was listed on the National Register of Historic Places in 2009.

References

Farms on the National Register of Historic Places in Virginia
Greek Revival houses in Virginia
Houses completed in 1829
Buildings and structures in Patrick County, Virginia
National Register of Historic Places in Patrick County, Virginia